Zhoa is a town and commune in Cameroon.

Zhoa is one of the Communes in the North Western Region of Cameroon. Main Towns in the menchum division include Weh (We in French), Esu, and Zhoa. Zhao is the administrative capital of the Zhoa Commune.Zhoa is found in the menchum division and the headquarters of fungom subdivision. the zhoa people speak the zhoa language.

References
 Site de la primature - Élections municipales 2002 
 Contrôle de gestion et performance des services publics communaux des villes camerounaises - Thèse de Donation Avele,  Université Montesquieu Bordeaux IV 
 Charles Nanga, La réforme de l’administration territoriale au Cameroun à la lumière de la loi constitutionnelle n° 96/06 du 18 janvier 1996, Mémoire ENA. 

Populated places in Northwest Region (Cameroon)
Communes of Cameroon